The George Robert White Memorial, also known as The Spirit of Giving, is an outdoor memorial commemorating George Robert White by artist Daniel Chester French and architect Henry Bacon, installed in Boston's Public Garden, in the U.S. state of Massachusetts. The 1924 bronze sculpture depicts an allegorical winged female on a Rockport granite base, above an elliptical-shaped granite and pebble fountain. It was surveyed as part of the Smithsonian Institution's "Save Outdoor Sculpture!" program in 1993.

References

External links

 

1924 establishments in Massachusetts
1924 sculptures
Allegorical sculptures in the United States
Boston Public Garden
Bronze sculptures in Massachusetts
Fountains in Massachusetts
Granite sculptures in Massachusetts
Monuments and memorials in Boston
Outdoor sculptures in Boston
Sculptures by Daniel Chester French
Sculptures of women in Massachusetts
Statues in Boston